Erika Hernandez may refer to:

Erika Hernández (born 1999), Panamanian footballer
Erika Hernandez (Star Trek), a fictional character on the science fiction television series Star Trek: Enterprise